Professor Wendy Thomson  (born 28 October 1953) is a Canadian-born public administrator and social policy researcher and advisor who has worked in both Canada and the UK. 

Thomson was the managing director of Norfolk County Council from 2014 until the end of 2018. Since July 2019, she has served as Vice-Chancellor of the University of London.

Biography
Thomson was born in 1953 at Montreal, Canada. She studied at McGill University, graduating with Bachelor of Social Work (BSW) and Master of Social Work (MSW) degrees. In Canada, she worked for various charities and other organisations involved in social services, including Centraide. 

Thomson moved to Great Britain in the 1980s, where she worked for the Greater London Authority before becoming Assistant Chief Executive of Islington London Borough Council (1987–1993). During this time, she undertook studies for a Doctor of Philosophy (PhD) degree in social administration at the University of Bristol, which she completed in 1989. From 1993 to 1995, she was Chief Executive of the charity Turning Point. She then returned to local government as Chief Executive of Newham London Borough Council before becoming Director of the Audit Commission. From 2001 to 2005, she served as the head of the Office of Public Service Reform in the Cabinet Office during Tony Blair's second government: she was appointed a Commander of the Order of the British Empire (CBE) in the 2005 New Year Honours in recognition of her work in this role. 

She returned to Canada when she was appointed Professor of Social Policy and Director of the School of Social Work at McGill University in Montreal in June 2005. Then, back in the UK, she was Managing Director of Norfolk County Council between August 2014 and December 2018. Since 1 July 2019, she has been Vice-Chancellor of the University of London: she is the second woman to head the federal university.

See also
 List of Vice-Chancellors of the University of London

References

 

|-

Living people
1953 births
People from Montreal
McGill University alumni
Alumni of the University of Bristol
Academic staff of McGill University
Canadian expatriates in England
Canadian Commanders of the Order of the British Empire
Local government officers in England
Civil servants in the Cabinet Office
Vice-Chancellors of the University of London